The Great Seal of Arkansas is used to authenticate certain documents issued by the Government of Arkansas. The phrase is used both for the physical seal itself, which is kept by the Governor of Arkansas, and more generally for the design impressed upon it. The Great Seal was  modified to its present form on May 23, 1907.

Design  
Title 1 of the Arkansas Code specifies that the seal “shall present the following impressions, devices and emblems, to wit: An eagle at the bottom, holding a scroll in its beak, inscribed ‘Regnat populus,’ a bundle of arrows in one claw and an olive branch in the other; a shield covering the breast of the eagle, engraved with a steamboat at top, a beehive and plow in the middle, and sheaf of wheat at the bottom; the Goddess of Liberty at the top, holding a wreath in her right hand, a pole in the left hand, surmounted by a liberty cap, and surrounded by a circle of stars outside of which is a circle of rays; the figure of an angel on the left, inscribed ‘Mercy,’ and a sword on the right hand, inscribed ‘Justice,’ surrounded with the words ‘Seal of the State of Arkansas.’ ”

History  
The present seal was approved by an act of the State legislature on May 23, 1907. This act amended the act of May 3, 1864, by correcting the wording of the motto from Regnant populi to Regnat populus.

Seals of Arkansas
The seal of the region changed over time.

See also  

 Flag of Arkansas
 Symbols of the State of Arkansas

References

Further reading

External links 

 

1864 establishments in Arkansas
Angels in art
Arkansas statutes
Birds in art
Symbols of Arkansas
Symbols introduced in 1864
Arkansas
Cultural history of Arkansas